Novosibirsk (also) is the largest city and administrative centre of Novosibirsk Oblast and Siberian Federal District in Russia. As of the 2021 Census, it had a population of 1,633,595, making it the most populous city in Siberia and the third-most populous city in Russia. The city is located in southwestern Siberia, on the banks of the Ob River.

Novosibirsk was founded in 1893 on the Ob River crossing point of the future Trans-Siberian Railway, where the Novosibirsk Rail Bridge was constructed. Originally named Novonikolayevsk ("New Nicholas") in honor of Emperor Nicholas II, the city rapidly grew into a major transport, commercial, and industrial hub. Novosibirsk was ravaged by the Russian Civil War but recovered during the early Soviet period and gained its present name, Novosibirsk ("New Siberia"), in 1926. Under the leadership of Joseph Stalin, Novosibirsk became one of the largest industrial centers of Siberia. Following the outbreak of World War II, the city hosted many factories relocated from the Russian core.

Novosibirsk is home to numerous Russian corporations, the neo-Byzantine Alexander Nevsky Cathedral, the Novosibirsk Opera and Ballet Theatre, as well as the Novosibirsk Zoo. It is served by Tolmachevo Airport, the busiest airport in Siberia.

History

Novosibirsk was founded on the right side of the Ob, near an area traditionally inhabited by Chat Tatars. The  Russian town originated on 30 April 1893 at the future site of a Trans-Siberian Railway bridge crossing the great Siberian river, the Ob, and in 1895 became known as Novonikolayevsk, in honor both of Saint Nicholas and of the new reigning Tsar,  Nicholas II. It superseded Bolshoye Krivoshchyokovo village, located on the opposite side of the Ob, which was founded in 1696 and was resettled in 1893 due to the construction of the Novosibirsk Rail Bridge. The bridge, completed in the spring of 1897, made the new settlement a regional transport hub. The importance of the city further increased with the completion of the Turkestan–Siberia Railway in the early 20th century. The new railway connected Novonikolayevsk directly with Central Asia and the Caspian Sea.

At the time of the bridge's opening, Novonikolayevsk had a population of 7,800 people. The settlement developed rapidly. Its first bank opened in 1906, and a total of five banks were operating by 1915. In 1907, Novonikolayevsk, now with a population exceeding 47,000, was granted town status with full rights for self-government. During the pre-revolutionary period, the population of Novonikolayevsk reached 80,000. The city had steady and rapid economic growth, becoming one of the largest commercial and industrial centers of Siberia. It developed a significant agricultural-processing industry, as well as a power station, iron foundry, commodity market, several banks, and commercial and shipping companies. By 1917, the city had seven Orthodox churches and one  Roman Catholic Church, along with several cinemas, forty primary schools, a high school, a teaching seminary, and the Romanov House non-classical secondary school. In 1913, Novonikolayevsk became one of the first places in Russia to institute compulsory primary education.

The Russian Civil War of 1917-1923 took a toll on the city. Wartime epidemics, especially typhus and cholera, claimed thousands of lives. In the course of the war, the Ob River Bridge was destroyed. For the first time in the city's history, the population of Novonikolayevsk began to decline. The Soviet Workers' and Soldiers' Deputies of Novonikolayevsk took control of the city in December 1917. In May 1918, the Czechoslovak Legion rose in opposition to the revolutionary government and, together with the White Guards, captured Novonikolayevsk (26 May 1918). The Red Army took the city in 1919, retaining it throughout the rest of the Civil War.

Novonikolayevsk began reconstruction in 1921 at the start of  Lenin's New Economic Policy period (1921-1928). The city formed part of Tomsk Governorate and served as its administrative center from 23 December 1919 to 14 March 1920. The city received its present name on 12 September 1926, -Novosibirsk, which, in the Russian language, translates roughly as "New Siberian [town]".

After the Soviet Union abolished  governorates in 1929, the city served as the administrative center of the Siberian Krai until 23 July 1930, and of West Siberian Krai until 28 September 1937, when that krai was split into Novosibirsk Oblast and Altai Krai. Since then, it has served as the administrative center of Novosibirsk Oblast.

The Monument to the Heroes of the Revolution, erected in the center of the city in 1922, became one of the chief historic sites (essentially every child had to visit the monument on school field-trips during the Soviet years). Neglect in the 1990s while other areas were redeveloped helped preserve it in the post-Soviet era.

During Stalin's industrialization effort, Novosibirsk secured its place as one of the largest industrial centers of Siberia. Several massive industrial facilities developed, including the 'Sibkombain' plant, specializing in the production of heavy mining equipment. Additionally, a metal-processing plant, a food-processing plant, and other industrial enterprises and factories were built, as well as a new power station. The great Soviet famine of 1932–33 resulted in more than 170,000 rural refugees seeking food and safety in Novosibirsk. They were settled in barracks at the outskirts of the city, giving rise to slums. Its rapid growth and industrialization led to Novosibirsk being nicknamed the "Chicago of Siberia".

Tram rails were laid down in 1934, by which time the population had reached 287,000, making Novosibirsk the largest city in Siberia. The following year the original road bridge over the Ob River was replaced by the new Kommunalny bridge.

Between 1941 and 1942 the Soviets crated up and relocated more than 50 substantial factories from western Russia to Novosibirsk in order to reduce the risk of their destruction through war, and at this time the city became a major supply base for the Red Army. During this period the city also received more than 140,000 refugees.

The rapid growth of the city prompted the construction during the 1950s of a  hydroelectric power station with a capacity of 400 megawatts, necessitating the creation of a giant water reservoir, now known as the Ob Sea. As a direct result of the station's construction, vast areas of fertile land were flooded, as were relic pine woods in the area; additionally, the new open space created by the reservoir's surface caused average wind speeds to double, increasing the rate of soil erosion.

The Siberian Division of the Russian Academy of Sciences (formerly the Academy of Sciences of the Soviet Union) has its headquarters in Akademgorodok, and the town hosts more than 35 research institutes and universities, among them Novosibirsk State University, one of the top Russian schools in natural sciences and mathematics. Although it possesses a fully autonomous infrastructure, Akademgorodok is administered by Novosibirsk.

On 2 September 1962, the population of Novosibirsk reached one million. At that time, it was the youngest city in the world with the population exceeding one million. Novosibirsk took fewer than seventy years to achieve this milestone. On 8 June 1965, the city was the scene of a dramatic aerial stunt when Lieutenant Valentin Privalov flew his MiG-17 under the  October Bridge; an image which purportedly showed the event was later found to be a photocollage. In 1979, work began on the  Novosibirsk Metro Transit System, culminating in the opening of the first line in 1985.

On 1 August 2008, Novosibirsk was in the center of the path of a solar eclipse, with a duration of 2 minutes and 20 seconds.

Administrative and municipal status

Novosibirsk is the administrative center of the oblast and, within the framework of administrative divisions, it also serves as the administrative center of Novosibirsky District, even though it is not a part of it. As an administrative division, it is incorporated separately as the City of Novosibirsk—an administrative unit with the status equal to that of the districts. As a municipal division, the City of Novosibirsk is incorporated as Novosibirsk Urban Okrug.

City districts
 Dzerzhinsky (Дзержинский)
 Kalininsky (Калининский)
 Kirovsky (Кировский)
 Leninsky (Ленинский)
 Oktyabrsky (Октябрьский)
 Pervomaysky (Первомайский)
 Sovetsky (Советский)
 Tsentralny (Центральный)
 Zayeltsovsky (Заельцовский)
 Zheleznodorozhny (Железнодорожный)

Demographics

According to the Federal State Statistics Service, in January 2021 the number of residents came to 1,620,162. This is an increase compared to the 2010 census, when the population of the city was 1,473,754.

People from over eighty ethnicities and nationalities reside in Novosibirsk. The largest groups are Russian, Ukrainian, Uzbek,  Tatar, German, and Tajik.

Ecology

Flora
The best-known trees native to Novosibirsk are birch, pine, and aspen. Some mountain ash, hawthorn, spruce, and fir are also present. European species of apple, ash, elm, linden, and oak have been successfully introduced.

Geography

Urban layout
The layout of the modern city is based on the planning of the post-revolution period. Before 1917, there was no traditional city center in Novo-nikolayevsk. The main buildings of the railway management and the nearby railway station as well as the most important cathedral and the complex of the city's government were spread throughout the city. This changed following the revolution, with Lenin House built in 1925 in what was traditionally the main avenue, Krasny Prospekt while the first Lenin monument was built in Barnaulskaya Street, closer to the railway station. And thus, until the late 1920s, Novosibirsk did not have a clearly defined city center. The 1930s brought many changes to the development of the city: Its former Bazarnaya Ploschad (Market Square) was chosen as the site for the construction of the Opera House which started in 1931. The Stalin Park of Culture and Rest was established some distance from the main avenue and the city's administrative buildings and park created a radial around the Bazarnaya Ploschad.

Location
The city stands on the banks of the Ob River in the West Siberian Plain. To the south of the city lies the Priobskoye Plateau. The nearest major cities are Barnaul, Krasnoyarsk, Omsk and Astana.

Climate
The climate in Novosibirsk is typical of Siberia, with dry winters and far-below-freezing winter temperatures. Among the reasons for these temperatures are the absence of a nearby ocean and the lack of tall mountains at the north of Novosibirsk that could have held back freezing Arctic winds. In fact, Novosibirsk is the second-farthest substantially populated city from the ocean, the first being Ürümqi in China.

The climate is humid continental (Köppen Dfb), with warm summers and bitterly cold winters. Snow is frequent, falling on almost half of all winter days, but individual snowfalls are usually light.

Travellers coming from countries with mild climates may find Novosibirsk's winter extremely cold, but it is a lot less severe than further east in Siberia and the Russian Far East, especially considering its latitude of 55°N. For example, Novosibirsk is less cold during winter nights than Spassk-Dalny at eleven degrees lower latitude.

Broadcasting

Novosibirsk is home to Russia's most powerful shortwave relay station east of the Ural mountains. This relay station can reach most of South Asia, the Middle East, and China. The Magadan and Vladivostok relay stations when operated in conjunction with Novosibirsk can guarantee that the Voice of Russia or any other broadcaster renting time at Novosibirsk is heard in the intended target area.

Transportation

International and intercity transportation

Airports

The city is served by Novosibirsk Tolmachevo Airport, which connects Novosibirsk with most of Russia's largest cities and most countries of Europe and Asia. Tolmachevo is the hub for S7 Airlines.

There is also the auxiliary Yeltsovka Airport.

A smaller field for general aviation at Novosibirsk Severny Airport was closed in 2012. In August 2008, the First World Aerobatics Championship in Yak-52 aircraft was held at the airport.

Railway stations

Novosibirsk is a major stop on the Trans-Siberian Railway and the north end of Turkestan–Siberia Railway. The main railway station of Novosibirsk is Novosibirsk-Glavny station ("Glavny" means "Main") which is located in the centre of the right bank part of the city. There are also Novosibirsk-Zapadny ("Zapadny" means "Western"), Novosibirsk-Vostochny ("Vostochny" means "Eastern"), and Novosibirsk-Yuzhny ("Yuzhny" means "Southern") railway stations in Novosibirsk. All intercity trains passing through the aforementioned stations stop at these stations. In addition, there are halts where only suburban trains stops, for example Inskaya, Seyatel, Razyezd Inya, and many others.

The many regular intercity trains connect Novosibirsk with Russian cities in Siberia, the Far East, Ural, and European Russia. International trains connect the city with China, Mongolia, Belarus, and countries in Central Asia.

Bus stations
The old Novosibirsk Bus Station located on Krasny Avenue in the right bank part of the city near Kommunalny Bridge was opened in 1964 and eventually closed on 6 April 2020. There is a plan to build some new bus stations on the periphery of the city; the first of these new bus stations was built on Gusinobrodskoe Сhaussee and was opened on 18 December 2019. Until the completion of remaining new bus stations, some bus stops in the city are being used by intercity bus services.

The many regular intercity/international bus routes connect Novosibirsk with most cities of the southern part of Western Siberia and major cities of Central Asia.

River passenger terminals
The building of Novosibirsk river passenger terminal (Russian: Речной вокзал) on the Ob river was opened in 1974. Later, the self-titled metro station was opened near the building of the terminal. On 7 March 2003, there was the strong fire in the building of the terminal. The part of the building was beyond repair and was demolished.

At present day, only two regular passenger lines are operational: Novosibirsk - Kudryash island - Yagodnaya - Cheremushki - Novaya Zarya - Bibikha - Sedova Zaimka and Novosibirsk - Berdsk. There are also cruises on the Ob river and the Novosibirsk Reservoir including to Tomsk and Barnaul.

Usually, the period of navigability is opened in late April or early May and is closed in late September or early October.

City public transportation

Metro
Сhronologically, Novosibirsk was the fourth city in Russia in which a metro system was established, after Moscow, Saint Petersburg, and Nizhny Novgorod. It was therefore also the first city in Siberia. The Novosibirsk Metro was opened in 1985. As of 2022, the system has 2 dual track lines (Leninskaya (Red) and Dzerzhinskaya (Green)) and 13 stations.

Tram system
The Novosibirsk tram system was launched in 1934. As of 2022, the network has 10 routes: 6 of them are situated in left-bank part of the city, 4 of them are situated in right-bank of the city.

Trolleybus system
The Novosibirsk trolleybus system was launched in 1957. As of 2022, the network has 14 routes.

Bus system
The Novosibirsk bus system was launched in 1923. As of 2022, system consists of 52 routes served by buses over 10 metres long and 17 routes served by smaller buses.

Route taxi
The Novosibirsk route taxi system (marshrutka) have operated in the city since late 1970s. In 1989, first private carriers appeared. Since 1990s only private route taxis carriers have been existing. There are 56 marshrutkas routes in Novosibirsk.

Waterbus system
As of 2021, the Novosibirsk waterbus system includes the following routes: 

 Novosibirsk river passenger terminal - Beach "Bugrinskaya Roshcha" - Korablik Island
 Novosibirsk river passenger terminal - Severo-Chemskoy residential area - Allotment garden community "Smorodinka" - Allotment garden community "Tikhie Zori"
 Novosibirsk river passenger terminal - Novosibirsk Waterpark (the last route was not included in the plan of navigational season 2021 due to suspension of Waterpark's operation).

Usually, the period of navigability is opened in late April or early May and is closed in late September or early October.

Economy

Novosibirsk is a large industrial center. The industrial complex consists of 214 large and average-sized industrial enterprises. These produce more than two-thirds of all industrial output of the Novosibirsk region. Leading industries are aerospace (Chkalov's Novosibirsk Aircraft Plant), nuclear fuel (Novosibirsk Chemical Concentrates Plant), turbo and hydroelectric generators (NPO ELSIB), textile machinery (Textilmach), agriculture machinery (NPO "Sibselmash"), electronics components and devices production (Novosibirsk Factory and Design Bureau of Semiconductor Devices NZPP, OXID Novosibirsk Plant of Radio components), and metallurgy and metalworking (Kuzmina's Novosibirsk Metallurgical Plant, Novosibirsk Tin Plant OJSC, and JSC Plant of Rare Metals).

According to the television station RBC, Novosibirsk took third place in 2008 in the list of Russian cities most attractive to businesses (in 2007 it was placed thirteenth).

The Rich Family multi-national retailer was founded in Novosibirsk in 2002 and continues to maintain their headquarters in the city. Before the relocation of its headquarters to Ob, S7 Airlines had its head office in Novosibirsk.

The headquarters of a number of large Russian companies are located in Novosibirsk:

 RATM Holding
 Novosibirsk Aircraft Production Association Plant (NAPO) (a subsidiary of Sukhoi)
 Belon
 Center of Financial Technologies
 Siberian Coast Food Company (until 2009)
 NETA IT Company (retail, system integrator, software sales)
 Parallels IT Company (software for virtualization)
 Inmarko Food Company
 Siberian Food Corporation
 Electro-vacuum plant (the largest glass bottle factory in the Asian part of the country)
 NPO NIIIP-NZiK
 2GIS

Sports

Several professional sports clubs are active in the city:

Novosibirsk is the home town of several former Olympians, including Aleksandr Karelin, a twelve-time world Greco-Roman wrestling champion who has been voted the greatest Greco-Roman wrestler of the twentieth century by the sport's international governing body of FILA.

The city also hosts a number of National and International Ice Speedway events. Siberia Novosibirsk competed in the Russian Ice Speedway Premier League in 2012/13, and will do so again in 2013/2014.

Music

Several contemporary classical violinists, such as Vadim Repin, the late Alexander Skwortsow, Natalia Lomeiko, and Maxim Vengerov, are natives of Novosibirsk. Also born in the city were punk legend, poet and singer-songwriter Yanka Dyagileva, tragic punk rocker Dmitry Selivanov, folk/folk-rock singer Pelageya Khanova, and cellist Tatjana Vassiljeva. The career of poet and singer-songwriter Tatyana Snezhina is connected with Novosibirsk.

The city possesses the Novosibirsk State Conservatory, named in honor of the composer Mikhail Glinka; Novosibirsk State Philharmony, home to Novosibirsk Academic Symphony Orchestra, Novosibirsk Philharmonic Chamber Orchestra, Russian Academic Orchestra of Folk Instruments, and other musical groups; Novosibirsk Opera and Ballet Theater; and several notable music venues.

Education

Novosibirsk is home to the following institutions of higher education:

 Novosibirsk State University (1959)
 Novosibirsk State Technical University (1950)
 Novosibirsk State University of Economics and Management (1929)
 Novosibirsk State Agricultural University (1936)
 Novosibirsk State University of Architecture, Design and Arts (1989)
 Novosibirsk State University of Architecture and Civil Engineering (1930)
 Novosibirsk State Medical University (1935)
 Novosibirsk State Pedagogical University (1935)
 Novosibirsk State Theater Institute (1960)
 Novosibirsk State Conservatory named after M.I. Glinka (1956)
 Novosibirsk Higher Military Command School of the Ministry of Defence of the Russian Federation (1967)
 Novosibirsk Military Institute named after I.K. Yakovlev of the National Guard Forces Command of the Russian Federation (1971)
 Novosibirsk Institute of the Federal Security Service of the Russian Federation (1935)
 Siberian State Transport University (1932)
 Siberian State University of Water Transport (1951)
 Siberian State University of Geosystems and Technologies (1933)
 Siberian State University of Telecommunications and Informatics (1953)
 Siberian Institute of Management of the Russian Presidential Academy of National Economy and Public Administration (1991)
 Siberian Institute of International Relations and Regional Studies (1998)
 Siberian University of Consumer Cooperation (1956)
 Siberian Academy of Finance and Banking (1992)

Additionally, there are more than 50 vocational schools in Novosibirsk.

Akademgorodok is a remote part of Novosibirsk dedicated to science. It houses the Siberian branch of the Russian Academy of Sciences and is the location of Novosibirsk State University and Novosibirsk Higher Military Command School. All other higher education institutions are located in the central part of the city of Novosibirsk on both banks of the Ob river.

The Quality Schools International QSI International School of Novosibirsk, previously located in Akademgorodok, opened in 2008.

Culture

Libraries
There are many libraries in Novosibirsk. The most significant libraries are the following:
 State Public Scientific & Technological Library
 Novosibirsk State Regional Scientific Library
 Novosibirsk Regional Special Library for the blind and visually impaired

Theatres
 Novosibirsk Opera and Ballet Theatre (1945)
 Novosibirsk Regional Puppet Theatre (1933)
 Novosibirsk State Drama Theatre "Old House" (1933)
 Novosibirsk State Academic Drama Theatre "Red Torch" (1932), directed by Timofey Kulyabin since 2015
 Novosibirsk Academic Youth Theatre "Globe" (1930)
 Novosibirsk Musical Theatre (1959)
 Novosibirsk City Theatre under the direction of Sergey Afanasiev (1988)
 Novosibirsk Drama Theatre "On the left bank" (1997)
 Novosibirsk Studio Theatre "First Theatre" (2009)

Philharmonic
Novosibirsk State Philharmonic Society was founded in 1937. It holds about 60 concerts per month using the following halls:
 Arnold Kats State Concert Hall (2013)
 Philharmonic Chamber Hall (1985)

Cinemas
16 cinemas, including Cinema Park which supports IMAX and IMAX 3D.

Museums
 Novosibirsk State Art Museum
 Novosibirsk State Museum of Local Lore
 Museum of Cossacks glory
 Novosibirsk museum of railway equipment named after N.A. Akulinin
 Museum "Siberian Birch Bark"
 Nicholas Roerich Museum
 Museum of the Sun
 Historical and Architectural Museum in the open air
 Siberian Memorial Art Gallery

Planetarium
Novosibirsk Planetarium (2012) was awarded in 2015 as the best social infrastructure object in Russia.

Botanical Garden
Central Siberian Botanic Garden is located in Akademgorodok.

Annual festivals, forums and conferences
 Siberian Snow Sculpture Festival
 Transsiberian Art Festival
 Monstration
 Festival of children's animation films "Firebird"
 Festival of Youth Subcultures "ZNАКИ"
 Siberian Astronomical Forum
 Documentary Film Festival "Meetings in Siberia"
 Festival of Russian Music "Pokrovskaya autumn"
 International conference for lawyers "SibLegalWeek"
 Sib Jazz Fest
 Science Fiction Festival "White Spot"
 Poetry Festival "Very New Miracle"
 International Christmas Festival of Arts

Novosibirsk Zoo

The Novosibirsk Zoo is a world-renowned scientific institution as well as a popular tourist attraction.

The zoo has over 11,000 animals from 738 species and is an active participant in thirty-two different captive breeding programmes for endangered species. Since 2016, the Center of oceanography and marine biology "Dolphinia" has been part of the zoo.

On average, around 1.5 million people visit the zoo each year.

Novosibirsk Children's railway

Small West Siberian Railway is the children's railway located in Zayeltsovsky Park.

It has 5 stations: Zayeltsovskiy Park, Razyezd Lokomotiv, Sportivnaya, Razyezd Eltsovskiy, Zoopark.

The railway is operational in summer.

Twin towns – sister cities
Novosibirsk is twinned with:

 Minneapolis, United States (1989)
 Saint Paul, United States (1989)
 Sapporo, Japan (1990)
 Mianyang, China (1994)
 Daejeon, South Korea (2001)
 Varna, Bulgaria (2008)
 Osh, Kyrgyzstan (2009)
 Kharkiv, Ukraine (2011)
 Minsk, Belarus (2012)
 Shenyang, China (2013)
 Yerevan, Armenia (2014)
 Sevastopol, Ukraine (2014)
 Ulaanbaatar, Mongolia (2015)
 Tiraspol, Moldova (2016)

Notable residents

Violinist Mikhail Simonyan, playwright and prose writer Nina Mikhailovna Sadur, three-time Olympic Greco-Roman wrestling champion Aleksandr Karelin, pop singer Shura, singer and The Voice judge Pelageya, rapper Allj and top model Sofia Steinberg were born and raised in Novosibirsk. Maxim Vengerov, an Israeli violinist, violist, and conductor was born here. Aleksandr Akimov, who was also born here, was the night shift supervisor on duty for Reactor 4 of the Chernobyl Nuclear Plant at the time of the explosion in April 1986.

See also

Novosibirsk Rail Bridge
State Public Scientific & Technological Library

References

Notes

Sources

External links

Official website

 
Tomsk Governorate
Populated places established in 1893
1893 establishments in the Russian Empire
Populated places on the Ob River
Renamed localities in Russia